Yusupov or Yusupova (feminine) is a Chechen, Tatar and Uzbek surname, which is common in the countries of the former Soviet Union. It may refer to:
House of Yusupov, royal Russian family, of Tatar descent
Felix Yusupov (1887–1967), Count Sumarokov-Elston, Russian aristocrat and one of the participants in the murder of Grigori Rasputin
Irina Yusupova (1915–1993), Russian Princess and daughter of Count Felix Yusupov
Zinaida Nikolaevna Yusupova (1861–1939), Russian Princess and mother of Count Felix Yusupov
Aliya Yusupova (b. 1984), Kazakhstan gymnast
Artur Yusupov (b. 1960), chess grandmaster
Benjamin Yusupov (born 1962), Israeli composer
Iosef Yusupov (born 1955), American set designer born in Uzbekistan
Ismail Yusupov (1913–2005), Kazakhstan politician
Iraida Yusupova (b. 1962), Turkmenistan composer
Lidia Yusupova (b. 1961), human rights activist
Tuti Yusupova (1880–2015), Uzbekistani longevity claimant

Chechen-language surnames
Tatar-language surnames
Uzbek-language surnames
Surnames of Uzbekistani origin